The International Alliance of Socialist Democracy was an organisation founded by Mikhail Bakunin along with 79 other members on October 28, 1868, as an organisation within the International Workingmen's Association (IWA). The establishment of the Alliance as a section of the IWA was not accepted by the general council of the IWA because, according to the IWA statutes, international organisations were not allowed to join, since the IWA already fulfilled the role of an international organisation. The Alliance dissolved shortly afterwards and the former members instead joined their respective national sections of the IWA.

History

The Alliance and the International: Anarchists versus Marxists 

In 1867, Mikhail Bakunin settled in Geneva and there he founded the Alliance of Socialist Democracy, in which other Russian exiles as well as Polish, French, Italian and other exiles were integrated. The Alliance counted on the collaboration of the Jura Federation — created in November 1871 and directed by James Guillaume and Adhémar Schwitzguébel - in which he succeeded in advancing his "apolitical" theses, contrary to participation in elections and in "bourgeois" institutions. Supporters of political intervention, following the theses approved at the proposal of Karl Marx at the Congresses of the International Workingmen's Association (IWA), formed the Geneva Federation.

The Alliance requested membership in the IWA, but the General Council replied that its statutes did not allow it as it was an international organization; thus, the Alliance agreed to be formally dissolved in April 1869, passing its members from Geneva to join the Jura Federation. The rest of the Alliance groups did the same, although the Spanish Regional Federation headed by Rafael Farga Pellicer and Gaspar Sentiñón founded a secret group in Barcelona around April 1870 which they called the Alliance of Socialist Democracy, endowed with a program and regulations that were the same as those of the Geneva Alliance. According to the historian Josep Termes: "surely, this Alliance was born in order to achieve - through this coherent and secret group - that the Barcelona Workers' Congress, which would be held two months later, would come out decisively for collectivist anarchism and apoliticism, putting an end to the predominance of the societal, cooperative and politicist currents". After the Barcelona Congress, Alliance groups were formed in other locations, especially when the Spanish Government began to take measures against the International because of the "panic" caused by the Paris Commune.

To avoid being condemned at the IWA Conference that was to be held in London in mid-September 1871, the Geneva Alliance decided to dissolve the previous month against opinion Bakunin himself, who was absent when the decision was made. Neither the Jura Federation nor representatives from Germany or Italy attended the London conference, held between 17 and 23 September. Anselmo Lorenzo attended as delegate of the Spanish Regional Federation. There, a resolution was approved that supported the Marxist "politicist" thesis of the need for a workers' party to be constituted in each country. Likewise, the decision to dissolve the Alliance was ratified. The response of the anarchists led by the Jura Federation was to hold a congress on November 12 in Sonvilier in which it was agreed to reject what was approved by the London Conference and to send a circular to all regional federations - the so-called Sonvilier Circular - in which the convocation of a new Congress was requested. The Belgian Federation supported the proposal to draft new statutes of the IWA, in which the powers of the General Council would be curtailed.

Following the example of the Geneva Alliance, the Spanish Alliance decided to formally dissolve itself days before the Zaragoza Congress of the FRE-AIT was held in April 1872. However, as Josep Termes has pointed out, the group continued to function as such even though the bureaucratic organization had disappeared, "since it was impossible for ideological and personal ties to stop influencing its conduct. In practice, there was no difference between the actions of the Bakuninist group after the dissolution or before it."

The break between Anarchists and Marxists 

The Marxists were convinced that the International Alliance continued to exist, and the evidence they believed to be found in the writings and conduct of Bakunin himself, who had not resigned himself to the dissolution of the organization. In fact, Bakunin was convinced that it had not disappeared and wrote so in some letters that would later be used by the General Council as "evidence" against him during the IWA's Hague Congress. On April 5, 1872, he wrote to the Spanish Alliance member Francisco Mora Méndez: "You know without a doubt that in Italy, the International and our beloved Alliance have acquired a great development ...". Furthermore, Bakunin was also convinced that the supporters of the General Council were active in a secret party: the Communist League, founded in 1847 - although it had been dissolved in 1852.

On July 24, 1872, shortly after the Marxists of the Spanish Regional Federation were expelled from the organization, Friedrich Engels wrote on behalf of the General Council to the FRE Council asking for their names, activities and positions held by the members of the Alliance, adding that, if the Spanish Council did not respond, the General Council would denounce its members "for violating the spirit and the letter of the General Statutes and traitors to the International [...] for the benefit of a secret society not only alien to it, but hostile." The Federal Council did not give the names, claiming that it was only accountable to the FRE Congresses. In addition, the Barcelona Alliance group assured that its Alliance should not "be confused with the Alliance of Socialist Democracy, a public section of Geneva, which had members in several countries, since the Alliance that we founded in Spain did not have anything in common with that one but the conformity of ideas."

Between September 2 and 7, 1872, the Hague Congress was held in which the final break between Marxists and Anarchists took place. Most of the delegates supported the Marxist theses approved in previous congresses, such as those relating to "the constitution of the proletariat into a political party" and the connection between the economic struggle and the political struggle. And, in addition, they agreed to the expulsion of Mikhail Bakunin and of his Swiss ally James Guillaume for not having dissolved the Alliance. The delegates in favor of the "anti-authoritarian" positions signed a manifesto showing their disagreement with the expulsion and decided to meet in Saint-Imier, to hold a separate congress in which the expulsion of Bakunin and Guillaume was annulled, did not recognize the General Council appointed in The Hague and approved a resolution that included the anarchist theses, insisting that "the destruction of all political power is the first duty of the proletariat" and that "all allegedly provisional and revolutionary political power [... ] cannot be more than a hoax." It was also agreed that the regional federations would interact with each other outside the General Council, thereby de facto separating themselves from the IWA. Thus arose the Anarchist St. Imier International, with which the anarchist split from the International Workingmen's Association was consummated.

Program and strategy
The Alliance program, written by Bakunin, read as follows:

In a letter he wrote to the Spanish Alliance member Tomás González Morago when the Alliance was formally dissolved, Bakunin explained the organization's strategy:

See also 
 Virginie Barbet

References

Bibliography

External links 
 The Rules and Program of the International Alliance of Socialist Democracy
 Mikhail Bakunin: On the Program of the Alliance
 Marx's Marginal Notes on the Program and Rules of Bakunin's International Alliance of Socialist Democracy

1868 establishments in Switzerland
1870 establishments in Spain
1871 disestablishments in Switzerland
1872 disestablishments in Spain
History of socialism
History of anarchism
Defunct international anarchist organizations
International political organizations
Libertarian socialist organizations
Organizations established in 1868
Organizations disestablished in 1871